The Magnificent Evans is a 1984 BBC situation comedy written by Roy Clarke and starring Ronnie Barker, Sharon Morgan and Myfanwy Talog.

Plot

Ronnie Barker played Welsh photographer Plantagenet Evans, a tactless but likeable bully with an intolerance towards fools and an overdeveloped sense of his own abilities. Sharon Morgan played Evans's long-time fiancée Rachel, who also doubled as his assistant and had a full-time job steering his lusting eyes away from other women and back to his job.

The series was filmed on location at the old Gwalia bakery on Irfon Terrace in Llanwrtyd Wells, Powys.

It was written by Roy Clarke, who also wrote Open All Hours for Barker, plus successful sitcoms Last of the Summer Wine and Keeping Up Appearances. However, despite it being a much heralded series, securing the front cover of the BBC listing magazine Radio Times for their autumn season of new programming, only one series was made and neither Evans nor the premise had the chance to develop any further. The BBC has never repeated the series on any of its channels. The series is now available on Region One DVD and on Region Two DVD as part of The Ultimate Ronnie Barker DVD Collection.

Characters
 Ronnie Barker as Plantagenet Evans, an unsuccessful Welsh photographer and self acclaimed genius.
 Sharon Morgan as Rachel Harris, Evans long time fiancée and personal assistant who does most of the work and waits impatiently for marriage.
 Myfanwy Talog as Bronwyn, Rachel's uptight and prudish sister.
 William Thomas (actor) as Probert, Bronwyn's similarly uptight, prudish and thoroughly boring husband.
 Dickie Arnold as Willie, Evans's cheerfully mute, toothless and alcoholic chauffeur and handyman. Evans has great misplaced faith in his ability to skillfully do almost anything, frequently commenting that he will "get the hang of it."
 Dyfed Thomas as Olwin "Home Rule" O'Toole, a militant but harmless Welshman who doubts Evans's supposed genius and is in love with Rachel.

Episodes

External links

 Guide to Comedy

BBC television sitcoms
1980s British sitcoms
1984 British television series debuts
1984 British television series endings
Television shows set in Wales